Embarrassment of riches is an idiom.

Embarrassment of riches may also refer to:

The Embarrassment of Riches (1906), a play by Louis K. Anspacher
 Embarrassment of Riches (EP), a 2006 music album by Elephant Micah
 The Embarrassment of Riches: An Interpretation of Dutch Culture in the Golden Age, a history book by Simon Schama
 An Embarrassment of Riches a 2000 novel written by Filipino author Charlson Ong